The Uncanny X-Men and The New Teen Titans is a crossover comic book published by Marvel Comics which features two teams of superheroes, Marvel's the X-Men and DC Comics' the New Teen Titans.

Publication history 
In 1982, the Uncanny X-Men and The New Teen Titans shared several similarities. In addition to high popularity and strong sales, both titles were helmed by respected, established writers, in Chris Claremont (X-Men) and Marv Wolfman (Teen Titans). Given the success of each title, Marvel and DC recognized the sales potential of a jointly published crossover, with X-Men writer Chris Claremont scripting the story and Walt Simonson and Terry Austin providing the art. The comic was lettered by X-Men letterer Tom Orzechowski and edited by X-Mens Louise Jones. Len Wein, the editor of The New Teen Titans, acted as DC's liaison with Marvel on the project.

Plot summary
Seeking to co-opt the near-limitless power of the Source, the evil space tyrant Darkseid continues his efforts to break through the Source Wall, which is depicted as a physical wall for the first time in this story. Thinking that the energy associated with the Phoenix Force can help him penetrate the mysteries of the Source, Darkseid sets into motion a plan to recreate the Dark Phoenix by tapping into the memories of her former teammates, the X-Men, as well as drawing the residue of her power from a variety of sources, and then amplifying that residue, using energy streaming from the rupture of the Source Wall. With his help, Metron had pierced the Wall and his sacrifice effected a small rupture which bled a steady stream of energy. Both superhero teams are alerted to the dangers by the Titans' Starfire, who has knowledge of Dark Phoenix's immense destructive power.

Despite their best efforts, each team is defeated and captured by Deathstroke the Terminator and Darkseid's shock troops. Darkseid brings the Dark Phoenix back to life. Both super-teams work together, freeing themselves and defeating their enemies in a climactic battle. Colossus prevents the gathering of psionic residue at a western mesa and this results in the Dark Phoenix simulation being flawed, and exploiting said flaw enables the two teams to drive a wedge between Dark Phoenix and Darkseid. Professor X and Cyclops convince what is left of Jean Grey's human consciousness that she is being manipulated, and she once again sacrifices herself to defeat Darkseid, repairing all the damage in doing so. What had been Darkseid is now part of the Source Wall, and Metron returns home, whatever he sought having been attained.

Critical response 
The Slings and Arrows Comic Guide wrote that "Claremont courageously defies tradition by filling an unbalanced basket of guest stars, and Walt Simonson's first-rate pencils contribute to the finest Marvel/DC co-production." Comics historian Matthew K. Manning calls it "one of the most well-received crossovers of its time - or of any time for that matter."

Aborted sequel 
Despite the success of the project, The Uncanny X-Men and The New Teen Titans represented the last new DC–Marvel intercompany crossover for over a decade. A planned "X-Men/Teen Titans" #2, by the Titans creative team of Marv Wolfman and George Pérez, was scheduled for publication near Christmas 1983. X-Men writer Claremont had shared details of future X-Men storylines with Wolfman to facilitate Wolfman's writing of the script. Pérez was slated to draw the much-anticipated JLA/Avengers intercompany crossover due for publication in 1984, which was eventually scuttled due to editorial squabbling between the two companies. Continuing disagreements between Marvel and DC and Pérez's anger over the demise of the JLA/Avengers book resulted in the eventual cancellation of X-Men/Teen Titans #2 as well. Unlike the JLA/Avengers, a good portion of which had already been drawn by Pérez, no artwork was ever drawn for The Uncanny X-Men and The New Teen Titans sequel. It was not until 1994's Batman/Punisher: Lake of Fire that DC and Marvel joined forces again in a new publishing venture.

References

External links
 
 Marvel and DC Present Featuring The Uncanny X-Men and The New Teen Titans at Mike's Amazing World of Comics
 Uncanny X-Men/New Teen Titans at the Unofficial Handbook of Marvel Comics Creators

1982 comics debuts
1982 comics endings
Comics by Chris Claremont
Comics by Walt Simonson
DC Comics one-shots
Defunct American comics
Intercompany crossovers
Marvel Comics one-shots
Team-up comics
Teen Titans titles
X-Men titles